Rudolph Krampers & Jorgensen was a manufacturer of engines in Denmark, c. 1890 – 1960.

The 1911 catalog showed the Gideon line of upright marine semi-diesel engines and boasted that it powered most of the fishing fleets in Denmark and Norway.

The company manufactured automobiles under the name Gideon. This line of cars and light trucks was built in Horsens, Denmark, between 1913 and 1920. The cars became known for their high levels of construction quality but did not meet with much success. The chassis of the Gideon was used on the first armored car in Denmark. The HtK-46.

External links 
 http://www.gtue-oldtimerservice.de

Engine manufacturers of Denmark
Danish companies established in 1890
Defunct manufacturing companies of Denmark